Mohammad Tijani may refer to:

 Muhammad al-Tijani, Tunisian ex-Sunni Twelver Shi'i scholar, academic and theologian.
 Muhammed Tijani, Ghanaian footballer
 Muhamed Tijani, Nigerian footballer
 Mohammad Habibu Tijani, Ghanaian politician